El Shark is a Lebanese daily newspaper founded in 1926 published in Arabic in Beirut, Lebanon. It is published by Dar El Shark also founded in Lebanon in 1926. The company also publishes Nadine monthly.

See also
List of newspapers in Lebanon

References

External links
Official website

1926 establishments in Lebanon
Arabic-language newspapers
Newspapers published in Beirut
Publications established in 1926
Daily newspapers published in Lebanon